The Das Tropas River is a river of Pará state in north-central Brazil. It is a right tributary of the Tapajós River; the mouth is located on the eastern side of the Tapajós about  after the Juruena–Teles Pires junction.

The river flows through the Itaituba I National Forest, a  sustainable use conservation area established in 1998.
The lower part of the river flows through the Mundurucu Indigenous Territory.

See also
List of rivers of Pará

References

Brazilian Ministry of Transport

Rivers of Pará